Hyphessobrycon amapaensis, sometimes more commonly known as the red line tetra the Amapá tetra, or scarlet tetra, is a species of fish endemic to Brazil.

Description
The red line tetra is similar in shape to the Buenos Aires tetra. It is a silvery fish with a red line running down the body, hence the name. Below the red line is a small yellow line and an even smaller black one. They grow to about 2.5 to 3 centimeters.

Distribution and habitat
The species is only known from its type locality, a small savanna creek in the drainage of the Rio Preto, where it occurs over sand and gravel bottoms.

In the aquarium
The red line tetra is a peaceful community fish. They are best kept in groups of 6 to 8. A heavily planted tank is recommended. The temperature required is 23 to 28 degrees Celsius. They are an egg scattering fish that does not care for its young.

References

Characidae
Fish of South America
Tetras
Taxa named by Axel Zarske
Taxa named by Jacques Géry
Fish described in 1998